Ján Petráš (born 18 February 1986) is a Slovak football midfielder who currently plays for Partizán Bardejov.

He came to Trnava in January 2011.

External links
Profile at spartak.sk

References

1986 births
Living people
Slovak footballers
Association football midfielders
Partizán Bardejov players
FC Spartak Trnava players
Spartak Myjava players
Slovak Super Liga players
People from Bardejov
Sportspeople from the Prešov Region